Gahnia xanthocarpa is a tussock-forming perennial in the family Cyperaceae, that is native to New Zealand.

References

xanthocarpa
Plants described in 1864
Flora of New Zealand
Taxa named by Joseph Dalton Hooker